Peder Rønholt (born 9 March 1974) is a Danish sailor. He competed in the Laser event at the 2000 Summer Olympics.

References

External links
 

1974 births
Living people
Danish male sailors (sport)
Olympic sailors of Denmark
Sailors at the 2000 Summer Olympics – Laser
People from Faxe Municipality
Sportspeople from Region Zealand